Brian Ronalds (born July 6, 1973) is an American actor turned producer/director/publicist/writer and is one half of "The Ronalds Brothers". In 2007, Ronalds produced and co-starred in the horror-comedy Netherbeast Incorporated, released in 2007 and directed by his brother Dean and starring Darrell Hammond, Judd Nelson, Dave Foley, Robert Wagner, Jason Mewes, Amy Davidson and Steve "Blue's Clues" Burns.

Career
After having success with his first film he went on to produce and co-star in Brian Pulido's horror film The Graves starring Bill Moseley, Tony Todd, Amanda Wyss, Clare Grant and Jillian Murray. In 2008, Brian and his brother Dean were brought on as staff writers for Tyler Perry's "Meet the Browns Season 2" and spent a little time in Atlanta, Georgia at Tyler Perry Studios.

In 2010, Brian co-starred and produced the crime-thriller "Dirty Little Trick" starring Dean Cain, Michael Madsen and Christie Burson. In 2011, Ronalds produced the feature film "Ashley" with Tom Malloy, directed by his brother Dean, and starring America's Next Top Model winner, Nicole Fox, Two and a Half Men's Jennifer Taylor, Tom Malloy and Michael Madsen.

Personal life
Ronalds was born in Los Angeles, CA, grew up in Littleton, Colorado, graduated from Columbine Highschool, received his BA in English at the University of Northern Colorado and currently lives in Los Angeles, CA with his two sons Leif & Logan, step-son Thaine, step-daughter Paige, and wife (actress and writer) Michelle Palermo.

Popularity
Ronalds was covered in several popular medias of India when he visited the Bollywood with Tom Malloy.

Filmography

Actor

Producer

Director

Writer

Special thanks

Other accolades

|-
|2005
| Phoenix Film Foundation
| Filmmaker of the Year
| 
|}

See also
 The Graves
 Netherbeast Incorporated
 Going Bongo

References

External links
 
 Fan Page on Facebook

1973 births
Living people
American film producers
American directors
21st-century American male actors